Roman Neumayer (1930/1931 – 23/24 December 2015) was a German ice hockey executive, coach and player. He served as the sport director of the German Ice Hockey Federation from 1970 to 1986, and as technical director for the International Ice Hockey Federation from 1986 to 1996. He received the Paul Loicq Award for service to international ice hockey, and his career was recognized by induction into the German Ice Hockey Hall of Fame.

Early life
Neumayer was born in the historical region of Bukovina in the Kingdom of Romania. He later moved westward and played ice hockey in Czechoslovakia and Austria. After retiring from playing, he became an ice hockey coach and tennis coach in Austria.

Hockey career
Neumayer served as the sport director of the German Ice Hockey Federation from 1970 to 1986. During that time, the West Germany men's national ice hockey team won its only Olympic medal, a bronze in ice hockey at the 1976 Winter Olympics at Innsbruck, Austria. He was also involved in founding the German Ice Hockey Museum on behalf of the national ice hockey federation.

Neumayer served as the technical director for the International Ice Hockey Federation (IIHF) from 1986 to 1996. As the technical director, he was an ex-officio member of all IIHF committees and acted in an advisory role to the respective chair of the committee. After retiring from the IIHF, he remained in a technical advisory role at the 1998 Winter Olympics in Nagano, Japan, and served as chairman of other IIHF tournaments.

Neumayer received the Paul Loicq Award in 1999, in recognition for his service to the IIHF and promoting ice hockey worldwide. Two years later, he was honored with induction into the German Ice Hockey Hall of Fame in 2001.

Neumayer and team executives from the Augsburger Panther assisted in founding the Windhoek Lions in 2003, the first ice hockey team in Namibia. The Panthers donated jerseys and ice hockey equipment. Neumayer assisted in the planned construction of an arena in Windhoek and used his connections to convince Bernd Haake from Germany to coach the team and set up a training camp playing against teams in South Africa.

Later life
Neumayer died during the night from the 23 to 24 December 2015 at age 84 in Olching, Germany. He was remembered by Franz Reindl, the president of the German Ice Hockey Federation at the time. Reindl said Neumayer was an outstanding and formative personality who had a significant leadership role in winning the bronze medal during the 1976 Winter Olympic Games.

References

1930s births
2015 deaths
Austrian ice hockey coaches
Bukovina-German people
German expatriate ice hockey people
German ice hockey coaches
German ice hockey executives
German tennis coaches
Germany men's national ice hockey team executives
International Ice Hockey Federation executives
Museum founders
Paul Loicq Award recipients
People from Fürstenfeldbruck (district)
Sportspeople from Upper Bavaria
Year of birth uncertain